Toketee Falls is a waterfall in Douglas County, Oregon, United States, on the North Umpqua River at its confluence with the Clearwater River.

Toketee (pronounced TOKE-uh-tee), is a Chinook Jargon word meaning "pretty" or "graceful". The falls was officially named by a United States Board on Geographic Names decision in 1916, over alternate names Ireland Falls and Toketie Falls.

Description

With a reliable water flow on the North Umpqua River, the falls avoids the seasonal fluctuations of other creek-fed waterfalls in Oregon.

Hydropower plant
The waterfall is regulated by a dam built just upstream by PacifiCorp, which now regulates and reduces the water flow over the falls. The damming forms a reservoir called Toketee Lake. Previously the full volume of the North Umpqua River was allowed to flow over the falls, but the flow has been reduced by a penstock that utilizes the drop of the falls to generate hydroelectricity.

Post office
There was a Toketee Falls, Oregon post office from 1952 to 1956 during the construction of the PacifiCorp hydroelectric plant.

References

External links

 

Dams in Oregon
PacifiCorp dams
Waterfalls of Douglas County, Oregon